The Azcárraga family is a wealthy Mexican media dynasty. The center of their business empire, Televisa, is the main television network in Mexico and the largest producer and broadcaster of Spanish language media around the world.

Notable members 
 Raúl Azcárraga Vidaurreta. Founder of XEW.
 Emilio Azcárraga Vidaurreta, brother of the former. Founder of Televisa.
 Emilio Azcárraga Milmo, son of Emilio Azcárraga Vidaurreta.
 Emilio Azcárraga Jean, son of Azcárraga Milmo. Current president of Grupo Televisa.
Cristian Roberto Azcárraga, son of Azcárraga. Current vice-president of Grupo Televisa.
Gastón Azcárraga Andrade, fugitive from Mexican justice and former head of Grupo Posadas and Mexicana airlines.
Carmela Azcarraga Milmo, daughter of Emilio Azcarraga Vidaurreta.

External links
 History of EAV and EAM at the Museum of Broadcast Communications.

 
Mexican business families
Mexican mass media owners
Mexican people of Basque descent
Television company families